Lake Rotokawau is a small volcanic lake  east of Lake Rotorua in the Bay of Plenty region of New Zealand's North Island. The name is also used for lakes in the Kaipara District (Poutu Peninsula), Chatham Islands, on Aupouri Peninsula and near Lake Waikare in Waikato. Access is via Lake Rotokawau Road, from SH30 at Tikitere (Hell's Gate). The lake is owned and managed by Ngāti Rangiteaorere.

Ecology
Lake Rotokawau is a small, oligotrophic lake; the best example of what many deep Rotorua lakes were once like. Koaro (Galaxias brevipinnis), banded kokopu (Galaxias fasciatus), long-finned eel (Anguilla dieffenbachia), short-finned eel (Anguilla australis), smelt (Retropinna retropinna) and common bully (Gobiomorphus cotidianus) live in the lake.
The catchment is roughly 65% forested and 25% in agriculture.

Geology

The lake is a maar lake, formed by an explosion about 4,000 years ago, leaving cliffs of up to  around the lake. While the local rocks are rhyolite and pumice, with areas of alluvial sand and silt the formative eruption is one of only two, in a locality dominated by rhyolitic eruptions, recent basaltic fissure eruptions (the other is the 1886 eruption of Mount Tarawera). Tephra from the eruption was dated at 3440 ± 70 years before 1950. The eruption had the characteristics of a basaltic dike as there is a line of eruptive vents almost at right angles to the usual vent alignments of the recently active  Ōkataina Caldera. The maar crater is located almost exactly where this alignment intercepts a postulated continuation of the known fault defining the southern limit of the Tikitere Graben. The lake has one major inflow, the Waimata Stream, on the south side and also small geothermal springs on the north-west shore. The lake discharges via groundwater to the Waiohewa Stream, near Tikitere.

References

External links 

 1965 views of lake with drowned trees

Lakes of the Bay of Plenty Region
Maars of New Zealand
Rotorua Lakes District
Volcanoes of the Bay of Plenty Region
Taupō Volcanic Zone
Okataina Volcanic Centre